This is a list of radio stations in Canterbury in New Zealand.

During October 2010, several FM radio stations changed frequencies as spacing was being standardised to 0.8 MHz. Frequency changes continue as broadcast licences are renewed. Most frequencies are now spaced 0.8 MHz apart, with the first station at a frequency of 88.9 MHz. Infill stations are allocated to the 0.4 MHz frequency in the buffer between two other stations.

The Canterbury earthquakes of 2010 and 2011 have allowed community stations to play a greater role in the Canterbury community. Compass FM 104.9 FM has existed as a not-for-profit community radio station in the North Canterbury area since June 2011. Several radio stations have also ceased operation as a result of the Canterbury earthquakes. In Lyttelton, for instance, Volcano Radio 88.5FM was broadcasting 80 shows commercial-free from February 2008, but the quakes damaged equipment and forced the building to be demolished. Shows on the station included Project Lyttelton, Monday Report, children's programme Lyttelease, classical music show Vienna Volcano, and old school metal and hard rock show The Molten Metal.

Christchurch and North Canterbury stations

FM and AM
The following stations broadcast in the Christchurch area including Sumner and the Hurunui District.

Most high-power FM radio stations serving Christchurch broadcast from the Sugarloaf transmitter, located on the Port Hills due south of the central city. Stations broadcasting from this transmitter also serve the majority of the Canterbury Plains, as far south as the Rangitata River. The suburb of Sumner is served by infill FM transmitters located at Southshore and Sumner Head, as hills block the signal from Sugarloaf.

Low Power FM
There are a number of LPFM stations that are operating, or have operated, whose broadcast range may be less than that of the full-power FM stations.

Banks Peninsula Stations
The following stations broadcast in Akaroa or the Banks Peninsula area.

Mid Canterbury Stations
The following stations broadcast in the Ashburton or Mid Canterbury area.

South Canterbury Stations
The following stations broadcast from the South Canterbury area including the Mackenzie District, Waimate District and Timaru

References

Canterbury
Radio stations